Scott Cappos is a retired Canadian shot putter.

Born in Canada, his family migrated to the US and he became a naturalized US citizen. After graduating from Oak Lawn Community High School he competed collegiately for Indiana University (Hoosiers), won the Big Ten Conference in 1990 and 1991 and was a three-time All-American.

He won the silver medal at the 1994 Jeux de la Francophonie, finished fifth at the 1994 Commonwealth Games and fifth at the 1995 Pan American Games. He became Canadian champion in 1992, 1993, 1994 and 1995, in between Peter Dajia and Brad Snyder.

Cappos coached the Iowa Hawkeyes for eighteen years before joining the Nebraska Cornhuskers  as assistant throwing coach.

References

Year of birth missing (living people)
Living people
Canadian male shot putters
Commonwealth Games competitors for Canada
Athletes (track and field) at the 1994 Commonwealth Games
Pan American Games track and field athletes for Canada
Athletes (track and field) at the 1995 Pan American Games
Canadian emigrants to the United States
Indiana University alumni
Indiana Hoosiers athletes
Iowa Hawkeyes coaches
Nebraska Cornhuskers track and field coaches
Canadian track and field coaches
20th-century Canadian people